Sulka is a language isolate of New Britain, Papua New Guinea.  In 1991, there were 2,500 speakers in eastern Pomio District, East New Britain Province. Villages include Guma in East Pomio Rural LLG. With such a low population of speakers, this language is considered to be endangered.  Sulka speakers had originally migrated to East New Britain from New Ireland.

Classification 
Sulka may be described as having ancient Papuan (non-Austronesian) roots, which additionally displays morphosyntactic constructions and some vocabulary items associated with the Oceanic branch of Austronesian (i.e. languages of the St. George linkage such as Mali). Alternatively, it has been proposed as possibly related to Kol or Baining as part of the East Papuan proposal, but Palmer (2018) treats Sulka as a language isolate.

Sulka has some influence from the Mengen language.

Over 3,000 to 3,500 years ago, the linguistic ancestors of Sulka speakers arrived in the Papua New Guinea area.

History 
Although the history of the language is not well known, it may display a mixture of Oceanic and Papuan language traits. These are languages Sulka came into contact with, when the peoples speaking these other languages populated the area in neighboring villages, around 3,200 years ago.

Geographic Distribution 
Sulka is spoken along the coastal region of Wide Bay, on the Southern coast of the Gazelle Peninsula, on the eastern side of New Britain Island, Papua New Guinea. Some estimate speakers to number as high as between 3,000 and 3,500. Reesink (2005) reports on some Sulka speakers who have intermingled in neighboring villages with speakers of other languages such as Mali, southeast of Kokopo.

Phonology

Consonants 
The phonological system of Sulka comprises 28 contrasting segments, fourteen consonants, and seven vowels. On the topic of consonants, there is no recent evidence to support contrast between [b] and [β], therefore they're assumed to be allophones and are represented in the table of consonants as [β] only.

Sulka consonants are:

Vowels 
For its vowels, Sulka has a contrast between three front vowels: high, mid, and low, [i], [e], and [ε], but there is no instance of the central high vowel [ɨ]. However, when it comes to vocalic contrasts, it is not always clear. The mid front vowel may fluctuate somewhere between close-mid [e] and the more central-close vowel [ɪ], pronounced like English i in 'in'. The sounds [o] and [u] often fluctuate with each other as in the example of  '1SG verbal pronoun' [ku] and [ko]. This pattern of fluctuation seems to commonly occur for high front vowels. When looking at the length of vowels, long vowels are often confused with diphthongs. 

The seven vowel sounds can be found in the following words:

The words below contain closed syllables which are the only attested words showing that syllable length is phonemic:

Lexicon
A great majority of Sulka's lexicon is not Oceanic/Austronesian as stated by Schneider. However, there are a few words that are shared between both Papuan and Oceanic.

Examples from Geelvink (2005):

 pun 'base', as in a ho ka pun 'the tree its base', reflects POC . Laufer (1955:42) gives Mengen pun ~ Gunantuna (= Tolai) vuna as evidence for the presence of Mengen speakers along the Wide Bay before Sulka speakers arrived from South New Ireland. But Sulka pun is not a recent Mengen loan. Rath (1986, ex. 324) gives bega pu-na for 'tree base-3SG.POSS'.
 nut 'island' ~ POC *nusa, with reflexes such as nui in NNG and nua in PT, nuta in Southeast Solomonic (Ross, Pawley, and Osmond 2003:42).
 kus 'rain' appears to reflect POC *qusan (Ross, Pawley, and Osmond 2003:141); with kue as reflex in Mengen (Poeng dialect).
 kopoi 'fog' ~ POC ; *kopu (Ross, Pawley, and Osmond 2003:140).
 malo 'skirt made of bark from the breadfruit tree'. The Sulka form is identical to the one found in Mengen and Kove of the North New Guinea linkage, rather than to mal as it appears in languages of the St. George linkage. Of course, it may be a recent direct borrowing from Mengen.

Nouns
Selected Sulka nouns showing singular and plural forms (Tharp 1996: 161-163):

{| class="wikitable sortable"
! gloss !! singular !! plural
|-
| ‘part’ || mhe || mhetor
|-
| ‘vagina’ || kha || khator
|-
| ‘house’ || rɨk || rɨktor
|-
| ‘hole’ || nho || nhotor
|-
| ‘cliff’ || vɨk || vɨktor
|-
| ‘colorful belt’ || lɨp || lɨptor
|-
| ‘knife’ || kom || komtok
|-
| ‘water’ || yi || yitok
|-
| ‘heart’ || ngaung || ngaungtok
|-
| ‘nose’ || vorngap || vrongtok
|-
| ‘green lizard’ || gut || gɨtok
|-
| ‘song’ || kni || knituk
|-
| ‘head’ || lpek || lpetuk
|-
| ‘morning’ || rot || ruteik
|-
| ‘string bag’ || psang || vasngeik
|-
| ‘family’ || valngan || valngneik
|-
| ‘charcoal’ || valang || valngeik
|-
| ‘finger nail’ || pga || pgeik
|-
| ‘small garden plot’ || sar || sareik
|-
| ‘vein’ || spang || sapngeik
|-
| ‘shoulder’ || volha || volheik
|-
| ‘sky’ || volkha || volkheik
|-
| ‘mountain’ || vul || vleik
|-
| ‘container’ || kolhi || kolheik
|-
| ‘wild pitpit’ || ngaiphe || ngaiphol
|-
| ‘snake’ || vim || vimol
|-
| ‘bat’ || viɨng || viɨngol
|-
| ‘disciplining stick’ || khap || khapol
|-
| ‘fruit’ || mit || mitol
|-
| ‘mushroom’ || tling || tinngol
|-
| ‘fish’ || slang || sinngol
|-
| ‘meat’ || vothek || vothol
|-
| ‘place’ || ngaekam || ngaekmol
|-
| ‘roof of mouth’ || kning || kningol
|-
| ‘reed’ || psiɨng || psiɨngol
|-
| ‘bird’ || ngaining || iningol
|-
| ‘edge’ || ngaiting || itngol
|-
| ‘monster’ || ngainkuo || inkuol
|-
| ‘sister’s brother’ || lu || rlok
|-
| ‘mountain’ || vul || vlik
|-
| ‘coconut leaf’ || kriar || kerik
|-
| ‘forehead’ || lein || leinik
|-
| ‘kina shell’ || ngaek || igik
|-
| ‘fetish’ || tarmek || tarmki
|-
| ‘lobster’ || hivotek || hivotgi
|-
| ‘coss-buai’ || rongtep || rongtvi
|-
| ‘root’ || kavgot || kvukti
|-
| ‘lake’ || ngaenker || enekri
|-
| ‘lime’ || ngaiker || ikri
|-
| ‘anger’ || ngaesik || resik
|-
| ‘ear’ || ngaela || rela
|-
| ‘door’ || ngaegot || relot
|-
| ‘job’ || ngaeha || reha
|-
| ‘wing’ || ngaeho || reho
|-
| ‘road’ || ngaelot || relot
|-
| ‘sound’ || ngaeti || reti
|-
| ‘type of kaukau’ || ngoye || roye
|-
| ‘brawl’ || ngaus || raus
|-
| ‘brother’s brother’ || nopia || rnopeik
|-
| ‘father’s daughter’ || kvɨk || rkvɨk
|-
| ‘father’s father’ || poi || rpoik
|-
| ‘sister’s brother’ || lu || rlok
|-
| ‘brother’s sister’ || etem || rotmik
|-
| ‘father’s son’ || hal || rhol
|-
| ‘reef’ || kamngal || komngol
|-
| ‘tree’ || ho || hi
|-
| ‘skin’ || ptaik || ptek
|-
| ‘hair’ || ngiris || ngɨris
|-
| ‘grass skirt’ || nhep || nhek
|-
| ‘blood’ || ɨndiɨl || ɨriɨl
|-
| ‘yam’ || tou || sngu
|-
| ‘coconut’ || ksiɨ || ges
|-
| ‘speech’ || rere || rhek
|-
| ‘shell money’ || pek || kirpik
|-
| ‘ground’ || mmie || marhok
|-
| ‘person’ || mhel || mia
|-
| ‘road’ || ngaelaut || nghek
|}

Verb Structure

{| 
! |||Free!!Perfective Realis!!Future Irrealis
|-
!1SG
|dok||ko-~ku-||
|-
!2SG
|yen||i-||
|-
!3SG
|ëën||t-||
|-
!1PL
|mor||ngo-t-||
|-
!2PL
|muk||mu-tu||
|-
!3PL
|mar||nga-t-||
|-
!1DU
|muo||mo-t-||
|-
!2DU
|moe||më-t-||
|-
!3DU
|men||men-t-ngen-t||
|} 
Basic verb phrases are similar to Oceanic languages.  For a typical Austronesian sentence structure, it follows the Subject Verb Object word order whereas Papuan follows a Subject Object Verb word order.  Free pronouns mainly act as verbal or prepositional object.  Instead of having the bilabial nasal found on the free pronouns, first and third person plural have an initial velar.  Additionally, the basic verb phrase consists of a subject proclitic indicating both subject person/number and aspect/mood.   This is followed by one or more verbs, a (pro)nominal object where necessary, and optional oblique constituents.

According to Reesink (2005), the most common future form he recorded was the same one identified previously.  He cites this work by Schneider (1942:323) where this form was named a separate modal particle .

Habitual aspect and conditional mood utilize the same forms as the irrealis, both for 1SG and 2SG. In contrast, all of the other forms have more in common with the future pronouns because they also lack 3SG -t. Below, see examples of the habitual and the conditional, respectively:

Masculine/Feminine
Most Papuan languages have masculine and feminine distinctions.  However, the Sulka language does not follow this rule.  As for the Austronesian languages, where they have inclusive and exclusive opposition in nonsingular first person, Sulka does not follow them either (Sulka of East New Britain: A Mixture of Oceanic and Papuan Traits, Reesink, 2005).  As stated by Reesink, "There is not even a third person differentiation between feminine and masculine genders".

Papuan vs Austronesian
{| 
! !!Austronesian!!Papuan
|-
!Word Order
|SVO and prepositions||
|-
!Phonology
|Phonemic inventory resembles Mengen phonemic contrast [l] and [r]||Resembles Kol (almost) all consonants occur word-finally many consonant clusters
|-
!Lexicon
| ||Lacks typical AN lexicon
|-
!Verb Morphology
|Mood: realis vs irrealis as portmanteau with subject proclitics sequential ka||
|-
!Valency Changing Devices
| ||Transitivizing suffix no causative prefix *pa(ka) no reciprocal *paRi stem change for object number
|-
!Pronominal System
|Lacks gender on 3SG||Lacks INCL/EXCL on 1 NONSG
|-
!Nominal Constituent
|Prenominal articles/demonstratives||
|-
!Plural Formation
| ||Plural formation with irregular forms, some of which are possibly cognate with Kol, Kuot, and Lavukaleve
|-
!Adjectives
|Attributive adjective=nominalized form||
|-
!Possessive Constructions
| ||Possessor is prefixed to possessed item no POSS suffix on inalienables
|-
!Counting System
| ||Quinary
|-
!Deictic Elements
|Some cognates with Tolai||
|-
!Social Organization
|Moieties with clans resembling Mengen matrilineal||
|}

Further reading
Schneider, Joseph. 1962. Grammatik der Sulka-Sprache (Neubritannien). Posieux: Anthropos-Institut.

References

Foley, William A. The Papuan Languages of New Guinea. Cambridge Univ. Press, 1986.

East Papuan languages
Language isolates of New Guinea
Languages of East New Britain Province